The 2022 Hyundai Monterey SportsCar Championship was a sports car race held at WeatherTech Raceway Laguna Seca near Monterey, California on April 29, 2022. It was the fourth round of the 2022 IMSA SportsCar Championship and the second round of the 2022 WeatherTech Sprint Cup. Wayne Taylor Racing's #10 car piloted by Ricky Taylor and Filipe Albuquerque collected their first victory of the season.

Background

Entries

A total of 32 cars took part in the event, split across four classes. 6 were entered in DPi, 6 in LMP2, 6 in GTD Pro, and 14 in GTD.

Qualifying

Qualifying results

Race

Results 

References

External links

2022 in sports in California
April 2022 sports events in the United States
2022 WeatherTech SportsCar Championship season